Badr Al-Attas (Arabic:بدر العطاس) (born 8 March 1997) is an Emirati professional footballer who plays as a midfielder.

Career

Al-Jazira
Al-Attas started his career at Al Jazira and is a product of the Al Jazira's youth system. On 28 February 2018, Al-Attas made his professional debut for Al Jazira against Shabab Al-Ahli in the Pro League.

Al Dhafra
On 26 June 2018 left Al Jazira and signed with Al-Dhafra. On 20 October 2018, Al-Attas made his professional debut for Al Dhafra against Al-Wahda in the Pro League, replacing Suhail Al-Mansoori.

References

External links
 

Living people
1997 births
Emirati footballers
Association football midfielders
Al Jazira Club players
Al Dhafra FC players
UAE Pro League players
Place of birth missing (living people)